Sorrell and Son is a novel by the British writer Warwick Deeping, published in 1925. It became an international bestseller.

Adaptations
The novel has been turned into two films:
 Sorrell and Son, a 1927 American silent film directed by Herbert Brenon
 Sorrell and Son, a 1934 British film directed by Jack Raymond

In 1984 a six-part television series Sorrell and Son was released.

References

Bibliography
 David Ayers. English Literature of the 1920s. Edinburgh University Press, 2004.

External links
 

1925 British novels
Novels by Warwick Deeping
British novels adapted into films
British novels adapted into television shows